Eslamlu (also Romanized as Eslāmlū; also known as Eslāmbū) is a village in Dasht-e Bil Rural District, in the Central District of Oshnavieh County, West Azerbaijan Province, Iran. At the 2006 census, its population was 431, in 80 families.

References 

Populated places in Oshnavieh County